The Shire of Korong was a local government area about  west-northwest of Bendigo, in western Victoria, Australia.

History

Korong Shire was first incorporated as the Kingower and Wedderburne road district on 8 July 1862, and was renamed Korong at the time of its redesignation as a shire on 6 September 1864. On 1 February 1961, it annexed the Borough of Inglewood, which had been created a century earlier.

On 20 January 1995, the Shire of Korong was abolished, and along with the Shires of East Loddon and Gordon, the Loddon River district of the former Rural City of Marong, and surrounding districts, was merged into the newly created Shire of Loddon.

Wards

The Shire of Korong was divided into three ridings, each of which elected three councillors:
 Central Riding
 North Riding
 South Riding

Towns and localities
 Borung
 Fernihurst
 Glenalbyn
 Inglewood
 Kingower
 Korong Vale
 Rheola
 Wedderburn*
 Wychitella

* Council seat.

Population

* Estimate in the 1958 Victorian Year Book.

References

External links
 Victorian Places - Korong Shire

Korong
1862 establishments in Australia